St. Peter's Episcopal Church Complex is a historic Episcopal church complex at the junction of Pine and Church Streets in Hobart, Delaware County, New York.  The complex includes the church, cemetery, rectory, and carriage house.  The church was built about 1801 and is a small frame building, 48 feet by 38 feet, with a stone foundation, clapboard siding, and a gable roof.  It features a central projecting square tower surmounted by a wooden balustrade and an octagonal louvered belfry with steeple.

It was added to the National Register of Historic Places in 1998.

See also
National Register of Historic Places listings in Delaware County, New York

References

Episcopal church buildings in New York (state)
Churches on the National Register of Historic Places in New York (state)
National Register of Historic Places in Delaware County, New York
Federal architecture in New York (state)
Churches completed in 1801
19th-century Episcopal church buildings
Churches in Delaware County, New York